Peña Blanca Lake is a reservoir in Arizona, United States, located  northwest of Nogales. The facilities are maintained by the Coronado National Forest division of the USDA Forest Service. The lake was created in 1957 by the Arizona Game and Fish Department.Back then this lake was known for a plush resort that was located there. In 2008, the lake was closed to clean mercury contamination within the sediment, thought to be from old mines in the area.  Also the former plush resort was removed as well. The lake was reopened in August 2009. In 2013, an Arizona Department of Environmental Quality report showed that mercury levels were similar to those before the lake was drained and dredged. One potential cause for the high mercury could be naturally occurring mercury seeping through the faults or a spring in the lake, though these claims are still under investigation.

Fish species
Before Peña Blanca Lake was drained the fish population consisted of largemouth bass, bluegill, redear sunfish, green sunfish, black crappie, channel catfish, and black bullhead.  Stocked rainbow trout could be found in the lake as well.  Today the fish species that inhabit the lake are channel catfish, yellow bullhead, largemouth bass, bluegill, black crappie, and redear sunfish.  Stocked rainbow trout are stocked from October to March about once a month unless water quality is poor.  Crayfish are also present.

References

External links
 Arizona Fishing Locations Map
 Arizona Boating Locations Facilities Map
 Video of Peña Blanca Lake

Reservoirs in Santa Cruz County, Arizona
Coronado National Forest
Reservoirs in Arizona
1957 establishments in Arizona